The Telecommunications Act of 1996 is a United States federal law enacted by the 104th United States Congress on January 3, 1996, and signed into law on February 8, 1996, by President Bill Clinton. It primarily amended Chapter 5 of Title 47 of the United States Code.

The act was the first significant overhaul of United States telecommunications law in more than sixty years, amending the Communications Act of 1934, and represented a major change in American telecommunication law, because it was the first time that the Internet was included in broadcasting and spectrum allotment.

The goal of the law was to "let anyone enter any communications business – to let any communications business compete in any market against any other." The legislation's primary goal was deregulation of the converging broadcasting and telecommunications markets.

The law's regulatory policies have been criticized, including the effects of dualistic re-regulation of the communications market.

Background

Prior regime
Previously, the Communications Act of 1934 ("1934 Act") was the statutory framework for U.S. communications policy, covering telecommunications and broadcasting. The 1934 Act created the FCC, the agency formed to implement and administer the economic regulation of the interstate activities of the telephone monopolies and the licensing of spectrum used for broadcast and other purposes. The Act left most regulation of intrastate telephone services to the states.

In the 1970s and 1980s, a combination of technological change, court decisions, and changes in U.S. policy permitted competitive entry into some telecommunications and broadcast markets. In this context, the 1996 Telecommunications Act was designed to allow fewer, but larger corporations, to operate more media enterprises within a sector (such as Clear Channel's dominance in radio), and to expand across media sectors (through relaxation of cross-ownership rules), thus enabling massive and historic consolidation of media in the United States.  These changes amounted to a near-total rollback of New Deal market regulation.

Stated objective
The 1996 Act's stated objective was to open up markets to competition by removing regulatory barriers to entry: The conference report refers to the bill "to provide for a pro-competitive, de-regulatory national policy framework designed to accelerate rapidly private sector deployment of advanced information technologies and services to all Americans by opening all telecommunications markets to competition".

Enactment
The Act was approved by the 104th Congress on January 3, 1996, and was signed into law on February 8, 1996, by President Bill Clinton. It was the first bill signed at the Library of Congress.

Framework
A purpose of the 1996 Act was to foster competition among companies that use similar underlying network technologies (e.g., circuit-switched telephone networks) to provide a single type of service (e.g., voice). For example, it creates separate regulatory regimes for carriers providing voice telephone service and providers of cable television, and a third for information services.

Preemption One key provision allowed the FCC to preempt state or local legal requirements that acted as a barrier to entry in the provision of interstate or intrastate telecommunications service.

Interconnectedness Since communications services exhibit network effects and positive externalities, new entrants would face barriers to entry if they could not interconnect their networks with those of the incumbent carriers.  Thus, another key provision of the 1996 Act sets obligations for incumbent carriers and new entrants to interconnect their networks with one another, imposing additional requirements on the incumbents because they might desire to restrict competitive entry by denying such interconnection or by setting terms, conditions, and rates that could undermine the ability of the new entrants to compete.

Intercarrier compensation Under these conditions, many calls will arise between parties on different networks. While it might be possible to have the calling party pay its carrier and the called party pay its carrier, for various reasons it has been traditional in the United States for the calling party's carrier to pay the called party's carrier for completing the call — this is called intercarrier compensation—and, in turn, recover those costs in the rates charged to its subscribers. The 1996 Act requires that intercarrier compensation rates among competing local exchange carriers (CLECs) be based on the "additional costs of terminating such calls". However, the framework created by the 1996 Act set different intercarrier compensation rates for services that were not competing at that time but do compete today.

RBOCs may enter long distance To foster competition in both the long-distance and local markets, the 1996 Act created a process by which the Regional Bell Operating Companies ("RBOCs") would be free to offer long-distance service (which was not permitted under one of the terms of the 1982 Modified Final Judgement settling the government's antitrust case against the former Bell System monopoly) once they made a showing that their local markets had been opened up to competition. The list of Bell Operating Companies in the bill are: Bell Telephone Company of Nevada, Illinois Bell Telephone Company, Indiana Bell Telephone Company, Incorporated, Michigan Bell Telephone Company, New England Telephone and Telegraph Company, New Jersey Bell Telephone Company, New York Telephone Company, U S West Communications Company, South Central Bell Telephone Company, Southern Bell Telephone and Telegraph Company, Southwestern Bell Telephone Company, The Bell Telephone Company of Pennsylvania, The Chesapeake and Potomac Telephone Company, The Chesapeake and Potomac Telephone Company of Maryland, The Chesapeake and Potomac Telephone Company of Virginia, The Chesapeake and Potomac Telephone Company of West Virginia, The Diamond State Telephone Company, The Ohio Bell Telephone Company, The Pacific Telephone and Telegraph Company, or Wisconsin Telephone Company.

Wholesale access to incumbents' networks To allow new entrants enough time to fully build out their own networks, the Act requires the incumbent local exchange carriers to make available to entrants, at cost-based wholesale rates, those elements of their network to which entrants needed access in order not to be impaired in their ability to offer telecommunications services.

Universal service support made explicit Prior to enactment of the Act, universal service had been funded through implicit subsidies, levied as above-cost business rates, urban rates, and above-cost rates for the "access charges" that long-distance carriers paid as intercarrier compensation to local telephone companies for originating and terminating their subscribers' long-distance calls. Recognizing that new entrants would target those services that had above-cost rates, and thus erode universal service support, Congress included in the 1996 Act a provision requiring universal service support to be explicit, rather than hidden in above-cost rates. This requirement has only been partially implemented, however, and therefore significant implicit universal services subsidies still remain in above-cost rates for certain services.

Policy considerations of new environment
The regulatory framework created by the 1996 Act was intended to foster "intramodal" competition within distinct markets, i.e., among companies that used the same underlying technology to provide service.  For example, competition was envisioned between the incumbent local and long-distance wireline carriers plus new competitive local exchange carriers, all of which used circuit-switched networks to offer voice services.

It did not envision the intermodal competition that has subsequently developed, such as wireless service competing with both local and long-distance wireline service, VoIP competing with wireline and wireless telephony, IP video competing with cable television. Providers from separate regulatory regimes have been brought into competition with one another as a result of subsequent deployment of digital broadband technologies in telephone and cable networks.  Voice and video services can now be provided using Internet protocol and thus might be classified as unregulated information services, but these services compete directly with regulated traditional voice and video services.  Moreover, these digital technologies do not recognize national borders, much less state boundaries.

Given the focus on intramodal competition and the lack of intermodal competition, there was little concern about statutory or regulatory language that set different regulatory burdens for different technology modes. As a result, the current statutory and regulatory framework may be inconsistent with, or unresponsive to, current market conditions in several ways:
Service providers that are in direct competition with one another sometimes may be subject to different regulatory rules because they use different technologies. Some examples are:
For certain long-distance calls, if the caller uses a wireless telephone number, the caller's wireless carrier is subject to a cost-based "reciprocal compensation" intercarrier compensation charge for the termination of that call.  But if the caller made an identical call, from the same location to the same called party, using a wireline telephone (and hence a wireline long-distance carrier), that carrier would be subject to above cost "access charges" for the completion of the call.

When a long-distance call is made to a called party's wireline telephone, that party's wireline local exchange carrier can charge the calling party's long-distance carrier an above-cost access charge for terminating the call; but if an identical long-distance call were made to the same called party, from and to the same physical location, but to the called party's wireless telephone, the called party's wireless carrier is not allowed to charge the calling party's long-distance carrier any access charge for terminating the call.  Indeed, the average intercarrier compensation rate ranges from 0.1 cents per minute for traffic bound to an information service provider ("ISP") to 5.1 cents per minute for intrastate traffic bound to a subscriber of a small (rural) incumbent local exchange carrier; individual rates can be as low as zero and as high as 35.9 cents per minute — even though in each case basically the same transport and switching functions are provided.  (See CRS Report RL32889, Intercarrier Compensation: One Component of Telecom Reform, at pp. 2-5.)

the Federal Universal Service Fund is funded through an assessment on interstate telecommunications service revenues that exceeds 10% (the exact assessment rate varies from quarter to quarter); information services, even if they compete directly with the interstate telecommunications services, are not assessed.
Economic regulations intended to protect against monopoly power may not be fully taking into account intermodal competition.
The framework may not effectively address interconnection, access, and social policy issues for an IP architecture in which multiple applications ride on top of the physical (transmission) network layer.

Generally speaking, the number of broadband networks is limited by cost constraint up-front, fixed costs—which do not apply to applications providers.  In this new environment, there will be three broad categories of competition:
1. intermodal competition among a small number of broadband network providers that offer a suite of voice, data, video, and other services primarily for the mass market;
2. intramodal competition among a small number of wireline broadband providers that serve multi-locational business customers who tend to be located in business districts; and
3. competition between these few broadband network providers and a multitude of independent applications service providers. (In addition, there will continue to be niche providers that offer consumers users competitive options for specific services.)

These three areas of competition will all be affected by a common factor: will there be entry by a third broadband network to compete with the broadband networks of the local telephone company and the local cable operator?

There are four general approaches to the regulation of broadband network providers vis-a-vis independent applications providers (At present, the FCC follows the last two approaches):
 structural regulation, such as open access;
 ex ante non-discrimination rules;
 ex post adjudication of abuses of market power, as they arise, on a case-by-case basis;
 and reliance on antitrust law and non-mandatory principles as the basis for self-regulation.

There is consensus that the current universal service and intercarrier compensation mechanisms need to be modified to accommodate the new market conditions.  For example, the current universal service funding mechanism is assessed only on telecommunications services, and carriers can receive universal service funding only in support of telecommunications services.  Thus, if services that had been classified as telecommunications services are re-classified as information services, as recently occurred for high-speed digital subscriber line ("DSL") services, then the universal service assessment base will decline and carriers that depend on universal service funding may see a decline in support.  It therefore may be timely to consider whether the scope of universal service should be expanded to include universal access to a broadband network at affordable rates, not just to basic telephone service.

Major provisions

The 1996 Telecommunications Act is divided into seven Titles:

Title I, "Telecommunications Service": Helps to outline the general duties of the telecommunication carriers as well as the obligations of all local exchange carriers (LECs) and the additional obligations of incumbent local exchange carriers (ILECs).
Sec. 102. Eligible telecommunications carriers.
Sec. 103. Exempt telecommunications companies
Sec. 104. Nondiscrimination principle.
Sec. 151. Bell operating company provisions.

Title II, "Broadcast Services": Outlines the granting and licensing of broadcast spectrum by the government, including a provision to issue licenses to current television stations to commence digital television broadcasting, the use of the revenues generated by such licensing, the terms of broadcast licenses, the process of renewing broadcast licenses, direct broadcast satellite services, automated ship distress and safety systems, and restrictions on over-the-air reception devices
Sec. 201. Broadcast spectrum flexibility.
Sec. 202. Broadcast ownership.
Sec. 203. Term of licenses.
Sec. 204. Broadcast license renewal procedures.
Sec. 205. Direct broadcast satellite service.
Sec. 206. Automated ship distress and safety systems.
Sec. 207. Restrictions on over-the-air reception devices.

Title III, "Cable Services": Outlines the Cable Act reform, cable services provided by telephone companies, the preemption of franchising authority regulation of telecommunication services, VHS home video programming accessibility, and competitive availability of navigation devices.
Sec. 301. Cable Act reform.
Sec. 302. Cable service provided by telephone companies.
Sec. 303. Preemption of franchising authority regulation of telecommunications services.
Sec. 304. Competitive availability of navigation devices.
Sec. 305. Video programming accessibility.

Title IV, "Regulatory Reform": Outlines regulatory forbearance, a biennial review of regulations, regulatory relief, and the elimination of unnecessary Commission regulations and functions.
Sec. 401. Regulatory forbearance.
Sec. 402. Biennial review of regulations; regulatory relief.
Sec. 403. Elimination of unnecessary Commission regulations and functions.

Title V, "Obscenity and Violence": Outlines regulations regarding obscene programming on cable television, the scrambling of cable channels for nonsubscribers, the scrambling of sexually explicit adult video service programming, the cable operators' refusal to carry certain programs, coercion and enticement of minors, and online family empowerment, including a requirement for the manufacture of televisions that block programs using V-chip technology.  Title V also gives a clarification of the current laws regarding communication of obscene materials through the use of a computer.
Sec. 501. Short title.
Sec. 502. Obscene or harassing use of telecommunications facilities under the Communications Act of 1934.
Sec. 503. Obscene programming on cable television.
Sec. 504. Scrambling of cable channels for nonsubscribers.
Sec. 505. Scrambling of sexually explicit adult video service programming.
Sec. 506. Cable operator refusal to carry certain programs.
Sec. 507. Clarification of current laws regarding communication of obscene materials through the use of computers.
Sec. 508. Coercion and enticement of minors.
Sec. 509. Online family empowerment.
Sec. 551. Parental choice in television programming.
Sec. 552. Technology fund.
Sec. 561. Expedited review.

Title VI, "Effect on Other Laws" : Outlines the applicability of consent decrees and other laws and the preemption of local taxation with respect to direct-to-home sales.
Sec. 601. Applicability of consent decrees and other law.
Sec. 602. Preemption of local taxation with respect to direct-to-home services.

Title VII, "Miscellaneous Provisions" : Outlines provisions relating to the prevention of unfair billing practices for information or services provided over toll-free telephone calls, privacy of consumer information, pole attachments, facilities siting, radio frequency emission standards, mobile services direct access to long-distance carriers, advanced telecommunications incentives, the telecommunications development fund, the National Education Technology Funding Corporation, a report on the use of advance telecommunications services for medical purposes, and outlines the authorization of appropriations.
Sec. 701. Prevention of unfair billing practices for information or services provided over toll-free telephone calls.
Sec. 702. Privacy of customer information.
Sec. 703. Pole attachments.
Sec. 704. Facilities siting; radio frequency emission standards.
Sec. 705. Mobile services direct access to long-distance carriers.
Sec. 706. Advanced telecommunications incentives.
Sec. 707. Telecommunications Development Fund.
Sec. 708. National Education Technology Funding Corporation.
Sec. 709. Report on the use of advanced telecommunications services for medical purposes.
Sec. 710. Authorization of appropriations.

The Act makes a significant distinction between providers of telecommunications services and information services.  The term 'telecommunications service' means the offering of telecommunications for a fee directly to the public, or to such classes of users as to be effectively available directly to the public, regardless of the facilities used.'  On the other hand, the term 'information service' means the offering of a capability for generating, acquiring, storing, transforming, processing, retrieving, utilizing, or making available information via telecommunications, and includes electronic publishing, but does not include any use of any such capability for the management, control, or operation of a telecommunications system or the management of a telecommunications service.  The distinction becomes particularly important when a carrier provides information services, because the Act enforces specific regulations against 'telecommunications carriers' but not against providers of information services.  By one interpretation of the Act, a carrier providing information services is not a 'telecommunications carrier'.  For example, under this interpretation a carrier would not be a 'telecommunications carrier' when it is selling broadband Internet access.  With the convergence of telephone, cable, and internet providers, this distinction has created much controversy.  Under BrandX, the Supreme Court applied the doctrine of Chevron deference and thereby allowed the question of how to interpret the Act's ambiguous language to be decided by the FCC.

The Act both deregulated and created new regulations. Congress forced local telephone companies to share their lines with competitors at regulated rates if "the failure to provide access to such network elements would impair the ability of the telecommunications carrier seeking access to provide the services that it seeks to offer" (Section 251(3)(2)(B)). This led to the creation of a new group of telephone companies, "Competitive Local Exchange Carriers" (CLECs), that compete with "ILECs" or incumbent local exchange carriers.

Most media ownership regulations were eased, and the cap on radio station ownership was eliminated.

Title V of the 1996 Act is the Communications Decency Act, aimed at regulating Internet indecency and obscenity, but was ruled unconstitutional by the U.S. Supreme Court for violating the First Amendment. Portions of Title V remain, including the Good Samaritan Act, which protects ISPs from liability for third-party content on their services, and legal definitions of the Internet.

The Act codified the concept of universal service and led to creation of the Universal Service Fund and E-rate. The Act employs the following terms of art: "Information service" which is defined as:

Claims made in opposition to the Act 
When the smaller CLECs faced financial problems, the trend toward competition slowed, turning into a decade of reconsolidation. The two largest CLECs, Teleport Communications Group (TCG) and Metropolitan Fiber Systems (MFS) were acquired by AT&T and MCI/WorldCom.

Looking back five years after the bill was passed, the Consumers Union reported that wire to wire competition, the reason that sold the bill, had not succeeded as legislators had hoped. CLECs had captured just under seven percent of total lines in the country, and only three percent of homes and small businesses. Wire to wire competition accounted for only one percent of total lines nationwide.

The Consumers Union also raises one other major point. The Telecommunications Act of 1996 did not foster competition among ILECs as the bill had hoped. Instead, of ILECs encroaching on each other, the opposite occurred  mergers. Before the 1996 Act was passed, the largest four ILECs owned less than half of all the lines in the country while, five years later, the largest four local telephone companies owned about 85% of all the lines in the country.

Robert Crandall has argued that the forced-access provisions of the 1996 Act have had little economic value, and that the primary, sustainable competitive forces in phone and related, non-'radio', telecommunications are the wireline telephone companies, the cable companies, and the wireless companies.

The Act was claimed to foster competition. Instead, it continued the historic industry consolidation reducing the number of major media companies from around 50 in 1983 to 10 in 1996 and 6 in 2005. An FCC study found that the Act had led to a drastic decline in the number of radio station owners, even as the actual number of commercial stations in the United States had increased. This decline in owners and increase in stations has reportedly had the effect of Radio homogenization, where programming has become similar across formats.

Consumer activist Ralph Nader argued that the Act was an example of corporate welfare spawned by political corruption, because it gave away to incumbent broadcasters valuable licenses for broadcasting digital signals on the public airwaves. There was a requirement in the Act that the FCC not auction off the public spectrum which the FCC itself valued at $11–$70 billion.

It had been specifically named in the Declaration of the Independence of Cyberspace as an act "which repudiates your own [i.e. American] Constitution and insults the dreams of Jefferson, Washington, Mill, Madison, DeToqueville, and Brandeis".

Claims made in support of the law
A Brookings Institute study concludes that the law incentivized facilities upgrades and new construction in the Telecommunications industry, despite increased industry concentration. In the long term, this helped to spread broadband access to more of the country. The law led "baby bells" to offer long distance calling in two regions with sufficient competition, New York and Texas.

Later criticism
In later years, criticism of the Telecommunications Act continued. One commentator, Warren J. Sirota, criticized the media's coverage of the bill and noted one provision that hadn't been covered. He wrote that: "Rightfully, this major change [the Telecommunications Act] in the nation's regulatory structure is receiving considerable media and press attention. Unfortunately...most of the attention is going to the wrong issue, the Decency Act." He described this provision as "blatantly unconstitutional" and noted that the balance of the Act would "shape our future" by eliminating "barriers between the industry's segments, e.g., local and long-distance services, broadcast and cable television, etc."

The Kill Your Television website, which advocated people turn off their television sets, had a criticism of the law as well. They wrote:

thanks to the Telecommunications Act of 1996, the business is about to get bigger...Mergers, takeovers and acquisitions are becoming the norm in the television industry. The new law has stripped down the television ownership rules so much, that big media players can and will be more aggressive in buying out smaller stations...A new legislative fight is brewing on the horizon as the broadcast industry gears up for the introduction of digital television...The Telecommunications Act['s]...highlights include: Deregulation of most cable TV rates by 1999...End [of] the FCC partial ban on broadcast networks owning cable systems...Extends TV and radio station license terms to eight years...Eases one-to-a-market rule to allow ownership of TV and radio combos...in the top 50 markets.

In the 2003 edition of his book, A People's History of the United States, Howard Zinn wrote about alternative media, community newspapers and the creation of street newspapers trying to break up the corporate control of information. On that topic, he talked about the Telecommunications Act of 1996:

The impact of the Telecommunications Act of 1996 on the music industry is still felt today by musicians and the general radio listening public. The legislation eliminated a cap on nationwide radio station ownership and allowed an entity to own up to four stations in a single market.  Within five years of the act's signing, radio station ownership dropped from approximately 5100 owners to 3800. Today, iHeartMedia is the largest corporation with over 860 radio stations under its name across the nation. The Telecommunications Act was supposed to open the market to more and new radio station ownership; instead, it created an opportunity for a media monopoly. Larger corporations could buy out smaller independent stations, which affected the diversity of music played on air. Instead of DJs and music directors having control of what is played, market researchers and consultants are handling the programming, which lessens the chance of independent artists and local talent being played on air. This is a primary reason so many artists on air have the same sound.

See also
Communications Act of 1934
Consolidation of media ownership
COPE Act of 2006
Open access (infrastructure)
Internet Freedom and Nondiscrimination Act of 2006
Telecommunications Act of 2005
Orwell Rolls in His Grave, Riff 1996
United States v. Playboy Entertainment Group, Inc.

Notes

References
 Paglin, Max D., A Legislative History of the Communications Act of 1936, Oxford University Press, New York. 1989.
 Brinkley Act - Section 325(b) of the Communications Act of 1934 that was written into law in an attempt to halt live broadcasting from radio studios in the United States linked via telephone land lines to superpower border blaster transmitters located along the Mexican side of the Rio Grande (Rio Bravo) international border. This provision was carried through into the Telecommunications Act of 1996 by incorporation of the Communications Act of 1934, as amended to Section 325(c).
 Crandall, Robert, Competition and Chaos; U.S. Communications Since 1996, Brookings Institution, 2005.
 Hendricks, John Allen, "The Telecommunications Act of 1996: Its Impact on the Electronic Media of the 21st Century",  Communications and the Law 21(2), June 1999.
 Library of Congress, S.652.RS — 27/30 March 1995 — 104-23  Initial text of proposed legislation.
 Library of Congress. Senate Report 104-23, 7 June 1995  Document, description of the intentions for each section of S.652.
 Library of Congress. S7881-7912 — 7 June 1995 — S.652 Measure laid before the Senate. Speeches made by senators.
 Library of Congress. S.652 - All Congressional Actions w/Amendments All speeches, amendments on the Senate Floor, 23 March 1995 through 8 February 1996.
 U.S. Senate. 104th Congr. 2nd Sess. Vote 8 — 1 February 1996 Senate passes the final revision of S.652, sent to President Clinton who signed it into law on 8 February 1996.
 U.S. G.P.O., Public Law No: 104-104 Telecommunications Act of 1996.
 Securities and Exchange Commission.   Teleport Communications GroupTCG, Quarterly Report (10-Q), March 5, 1998, pages 3, 6–7.
Securities and Exchange Commission.  MCI Inc., Quarterly Report (10-Q), November 14, 1997, page 20. MFS
 Marcus, J Scott; "Is the U.S. Dancing to a Different Drummer?", Communications & Strategies, volume 60; WIK-Consult GmbH, Bad Honnef, Germany; 4th Quarter 2005 ; page 39.
 Taylor, Alan, We, the Media: Pedagogic Intrusion into U.S. Mainstream Film and Television News Broadcasting Rhetorics

External links

 Telecommunications Act of 1996 (PDF/details) as amended in the GPO Statute Compilations collection
 Communications Act of 1934 (PDF/details) as amended in the GPO Statute Compilations collection
Analysis of The Telecommunications Act of 1996 . This article by Fritz Messere (Associate Professor of Communication Studies at SUNY Oswego) describes the impact of the Act on radio and television broadcasting, Internet and on-line computer services, and provides sources and suggested further reading.
Harvey J. Levin: Pioneering the Economics of the Airwaves
The Invisible Resource: Use and Regulation of the Radio Spectrum
 "Impact of the Telecommunications Act on Jobs"

United States federal communications legislation
Acts of the 104th United States Congress
Act